Douglas David Phipps (born 27 July 1934) is a former English cricketer and British Army officer. Phipps was a right-handed batsman who bowled right-arm fast-medium. He was born in Edmonton, Middlesex. He was educated at Mill Hill School, before enlisting in the British Army, where he undertook training at the Royal Military Academy Sandhurst.

Phipps played for the Essex Second XI from 1956 to 1958. He made his only first-class appearance for a Combined Services team against Cambridge University in 1964. In this match, he was dismissed for a duck in the Combined Services first-innings by Roy Kerslake. In their second-innings, he scored 15 runs before being dismissed by the same bowler. With the ball, he took a single wicket, that of Tony Windows for the cost of 53 runs from 12 overs. He played various matches for Army and Combined Services teams from 1954 to 1969.

References

External links
David Phipps at Cricinfo
David Phipps at CricketArchive

1934 births
Living people
People from Edmonton, London
Graduates of the Royal Military Academy Sandhurst
Royal Artillery officers
English cricketers
Combined Services cricketers
People educated at Mill Hill School